Francis Marion "Cotton" Davidson (November 30, 1931 – December 23, 2022) was an American professional football player who was a quarterback and punter in the National Football League (NFL) and American Football League (AFL).

Davidson attended Baylor University,  and played professionally for the NFL's Baltimore Colts (1954, 1957), and the AFL's Dallas Texans (1960–1962) and Oakland Raiders (1962–1968).

Professional career

Davidson was selected in the first round of the 1954 NFL Draft by the Baltimore Colts.  In addition to playing quarterback, he also was a placekicker and punter.  An original Dallas Texan, Davidson was the first starting quarterback for the franchise.

After the 1954 NFL season, Davidson received word that he had been drafted by the U.S. Army.  He served in the Army for two years and did not take part in the 1955 NFL season or the 1956 NFL season. By the time Davidson returned to the Colts for the 1957 NFL Season, John Unitas was the team's starting quarterback.

While in the military, Davidson played quarterback for the Fort Bliss Falcons from 1955 to 1957. A game between the Fort Bliss Falcons and the Cannonneers of Fort Sill, Oklahoma, was played for a trophy called "The Little Brown Dud." The Cannoneers won the game and took home the Little Brown Dud. Cotton was awarded All-Army Quarterback in 1955.

On July 2, 1962, the Texans signed Len Dawson, thus ending Davidson's career as the Dallas quarterback. After the 1962 season opener, he was traded to the Oakland Raiders for the first overall selection in the 1963 American Football League Draft, which was used by the Chiefs to select future Hall of Famer Buck Buchanan. Just two weeks later, Davidson started at quarterback in his first game with the Raiders. Playing against his former team, he threw for 248 yards and rushed for a touchdown in a 26–16 loss to the Texans.

The high moments of his career were being selected to the American Football League All-Star Game twice: in 1961 and in 1963. He was honored as the MVP of the 1961 AFL All-Star Game while with the Texans.

Davidson finished with an all-time record of 19–33–1 as a starter.

Personal life and death
Davidson died on December 23, 2022, at the age of 91 in Waco, Texas.

See also
 List of American Football League players

References

1931 births
2022 deaths
People from Gatesville, Texas
Players of American football from Texas
American football quarterbacks
Baylor Bears football players
Baltimore Colts players
Dallas Texans (AFL) players
Oakland Raiders players
American Football League players
American Football League All-Star players